Selma Sueli Silva (born September 17, 1963) is a Brazilian author, internet celebrity and radio personality. She is a host from YouTube channel Mundo Autista with her daughter Sophia Mendonça since 2015; they are the longest-serving autistic Brazilian vloggers on YouTube. In 2019, Silva won the Special Tribute award, from the European Union program Erasmus+.

Biography 
Silva was born in Belo Horizonte, Minas Gerais, Brazil. She worked in the construction industry before earning a degree in journalism and public relations with an emphasis in Communication and Business Management. After serving as a Senior Communications Advisor at the Instituto Nacional do Seguro Social, she migrated to radio.

Thus, she initially gained prominence as an panelist and producer of the Rádio Vivo, one of the most traditional talk shows in Brazilian radio, where she remained between 1999 and 2015.  Upon leaving the station, she began to host the YouTube Channel Mundo Autista. In 2017, Galileo magazine ranked the channel at position No. 8 among YouTube channels that address the lives of people with disabilities. In 2022, the website Canaltech ranked the channel as one of the top five on YouTube focusing on awareness of the Autistic Spectrum and highlighted it as the only one on the list aimed at autism in adults.

She is a member of the UNESCO board of consultants.

Awards and honors 
In 2019, Silva received the Special Tribute from the European Union program Erasmus+ and a congratulations motion from Divinópolis, in addition to winning the business communication contest promoted by the Diários Associados conglomerate. In 2022, Brazilian newspaper Catraca Livre listed her as one of the six autistic celebrities who challenge prejudice.  In 2023, Mundo Autista was one of the winners of the fifth influencers award promoted by the Center for Communication Studies and the Business Communication Platform, by popular and technical votes.

Personal life 
Born and raised in an underprivileged community, Silva claims to have memories of feeling different from the age of three. At the same time, her parents divorced and she began to feel increasingly inadequate in her family and at school after returning to live in her grandmother's house, having received many labels for her peculiar behaviors.

At age 52, after hearing a question from her daughter, author Sophia Mendonça, diagnosed with autism at age 11, Silva decided to listen to her advice and sought out a psychiatrist, who identified her with the same condition. This led her to produce books and content about autism in adults and women.

Since 2005, Silva has been a member of Soka Gakkai International, a Buddhist organization affiliated with the United Nations.

Works

References 

Living people
21st-century Brazilian writers
Brazilian Buddhists
Converts to Sōka Gakkai
Members of Sōka Gakkai
1963 births 
People from Belo Horizonte
Brazilian journalists
People on the autism spectrum
Brazilian memoirists